Sensitive Prince (April 1, 1975 – January 24, 1991) was an American Thoroughbred racehorse. Out of the mare Sensitive Lady, he was sired by U.S. Racing Hall of Fame inductee, Majestic Prince.

Sensitive Price had the misfortune of being born in the same year as two future Hall of Fame horses, that year's U.S. Triple Crown champion Affirmed and his prime challenger, Alydar.

As a three-year-old, Sensitive Prince won Kentucky Derby prep races in Florida and at Keeneland Race Course. In the 1978 Kentucky Derby, which he entered undefeated under jockey Mickey Solomone, he took the lead early and held it until the field turned for home before fading to finish sixth. Later that year, he finished second in record time to Affirmed in the Jim Dandy Stakes at Saratoga Race Course but won three important races including the Jerome Handicap at Belmont Park.

Racing at age four, Sensitive Prince got his first important win of 1979 in the Gulfstream Park Handicap, then added two handicap wins before being retired to stud at the end of the racing season, having set three track records during his career.

As a sire, Sensitive Prince stood for a time at Wimbledon Farm in Lexington, Kentucky. He met with modest success, siring six stakes winners.

References
 January 16, 2001 Bloodhorse.com article on Affirmed and Sensitive Prince
 Sensitive Prince's offspring at the Triple Crown database by Kathleen Irwin and Joy Reeves
 Sensitive Prince's pedigree and partial racing stats
 1984 photo of Sensitive Prince at the Barbara D. Livingston Gallery

1975 racehorse births
Racehorses bred in Kentucky
Racehorses trained in the United States
Horse racing track record setters
Thoroughbred family 20-c